Valeriu Guma (born 29 October 1964) is a Moldovan politician.

Biography 

He has been a member of the Parliament of Moldova since 2009.

External links 
 Valeriu Guma pe site-ul Parlamentului Republicii Moldova
 Partidul Democrat din Moldova
 INTERPOL: WANTED BY THE JUDICIAL AUTHORITIES OF ROMANIA FOR PROSECUTION / TO SERVE A SENTENCE

References

1964 births
Living people
Moldovan MPs 2009–2010
Democratic Party of Moldova MPs